Bom Jardim is a municipality in the state of Maranhão in the Northeast region of Brazil. The population is 41,822. The former mayor of Bom Jardim, Lidiane Leite, was arrested for the embezzlement of US$4 million from the municipality.

The municipality contains a small part of the Baixada Maranhense Environmental Protection Area, a  sustainable use conservation unit created in 1991 that has been a Ramsar Site since 2000.
The municipality also contains part of the  Gurupi Biological Reserve, a full protected conservation unit created in 1988.

References

Municipalities in Maranhão